The 1961 Wisconsin Badgers football team represented the University of Wisconsin in the 1961 Big Ten Conference football season.

Schedule

Roster
QB Ron Miller

Game summaries

Minnesota
Ron Miller 19/37, 297 Yds, 2 TD
Pat Richter 6 Rec, 142 Yds

Team players in the 1962 NFL Draft

Team players in the 1962 AFL Draft

References

Wisconsin
Wisconsin Badgers football seasons
Wisconsin Badgers football